Sleepyhead is an American indie rock band formed in 1989 in New York, New York, United States.

Discography
 Punk Rock City USA (Slumberland; April 1993)
 Starduster (Homestead; 1994)
 Communist Love Songs (Homestead; 1996)
 Wild Sometimes (Carrot Top Records; May 2014)
 Future Exhibit Goes Here (Drawing Room Records; May 2018) - compilation of second and third records as above

References

Indie rock musical groups from New York (state)
Musical groups established in 1989
Musical groups from New York City
Slumberland Records artists
Homestead Records artists